Alex Rivera (born 1973, in New York City) is an American film maker, best known for his films about labor, immigration, and politics.

Early life
Rivera was born in 1973 in New York City, New York. His father is a Peruvian immigrant and his mother is an American citizen. Growing up as a bicultural youth in New Jersey, he took an interest in the fields of film, digital media, and science fiction. He is well known for his work Sleep Dealer, which premiered in the 2008 Sundance Film Festival. He was awarded the Creative Capital Moving Image Award,  Alfred P. Sloan Foundation Feature Film Prize and the Waldo Salt Screenwriting Award.

Career
Rivera studied political science and media theory at Hampshire College, graduating in 1995. He is also a New York-based digital media artist and filmmaker. Due to his knowledge and background in cinematography, his work address concerns of the Latino community concentrating on political issues such as migration, race and gender. In addition he uses language as a form of satire and humor to enhance the understanding Latinos contributions within various Anglo communities, much like the mockumentary A Day Without a Mexican. According to his website alexrivera.com, Rivera states that "over the past ten years he's been making work that illuminates two massive and parallel realities: the globalization of information through the internet, and the globalization of families, and communities, through mass migration."

Rivera, captures the process of migration and the social changes immigrants face in order to be considered a model United States citizen. The issues that are presented through his films impact the Latino communities because of the realism that is presented by characters in his films. They establish relationships with audiences, not only from the Latin/Latino community, but from all those who have experience dehumanization from their host countries. Rivera wants his viewers to understand that the "American Dream, is five minutes into the future, where the relationship between technology and a variety of political issues where it is precisely through a visualization of the dehumanization of migrants through technology that the film engages with their humanization."

Alex Rivera has made films about labor, immigration, and politics since the 1990s. Some of his work has been viewed as mockumentaries and works that illustrate the transnational struggles of immigrants. Rivera's work reveals the transnational obstacles immigrants face in fighting for inclusion in the U.S. while providing for public development back in their hometowns. Rivera's films raise questions about "immigrant labor as a mobile commodity and the relationship of this commodity (and the bodies that perform it) to capital accumulation". Rivera's use of hometown associations in his films illustrates the use of transnational neighborhoods (also referred to as transnational barrios) as a source of organization. Rivera also illustrates how immigrants use the dollar from the U.S. to reverse U.S.’s exploitation of the immigrant's hometown. His films also critique how U.S. immigration policy dehumanizes immigrants for their labor, and critiques neoliberal economic globalization through futuristic examples. Rivera's most notable film for critiquing U.S. immigration policies through futuristic examples has been Sleep Dealer, which is described as a "sci-fi border saga." Rivera is said to use influences such as Star Wars and El Norte to express the struggles of immigrants. In an interview Rivera draws parallels to express the U.S. as the Galactic Empire and the victims of U.S.’s immigration and economic policies as the Rebel Forces.

Awards and nominations
2021 MacArthur Fellowship 
Sleep Dealer (2008)
 Sundance Film Festival - Waldo Salt Screenwriting Award & Alfred P. Sloan Award 2008
 Berlin International Film Festival - Amnesty International Award 2008
 Neuchatel International Fantasy Film Festival - Best of the Festival 2008
 Gotham Awards - Nominee Breakthrough Director 2008
 Independent Spirit Awards - Nominee Best First Feature 2008
 Creative Capital award 2000
The Sixth Section (2003)
 Guanajuato Film Festival - Best Documentary 2004 	 		
 UrbanWorld Film Festival - Best Documentary 2004
Why Cybraceros? (1997)
Cine Festival - Best Experimental 1997
Papapá (1995)
Chicago Intercom Competition - Silver Hugo 1995
New York Expo of Short Film and Video - Silver Award 1995

Filmography

Film

Notes

1973 births
Living people
American people of Peruvian descent
American filmmakers
Alfred P. Sloan Prize winners